Repentance is a 1922 British silent drama film directed by Edward Gordon and starring Peggy Hathaway, Roy Raymond and Geoffrey Benstead.

Cast
 Peggy Hathaway as Queenie Creedon  
 Roy Raymond as Frank Hepburn  
 Hetta Bartlett as Lady Hepburn 
 Geoffrey Benstead as Toby  
 Ray Lankester as Dr. Smith
 Fabbie Benstead
 Ward McAllister

References

Bibliography
 Low, Rachael. History of the British Film, 1918-1929. George Allen & Unwin, 1971.

External links
 

1922 films
1922 drama films
British drama films
British silent feature films
British black-and-white films
1920s English-language films
1920s British films
Silent drama films